EX3 or EX-3 may refer to:

Arts, media, and entertainment
 EX-3, a Spanish mákina band
 The Expendables 3, a 2014 American action film
 Street Fighter EX3, a 2000 head-to-head fighting game

Automobiles
 Beijing EX3, a 2018–present Chinese subcompact electric crossover
 Geometry EX3, a 2021–present Chinese subcompact electric crossover
 Kandi EX3, a 2017–present Chinese subcompact electric crossover
 Peugeot EX3, a 1912–1914 French race car
 Toyota EX-III, a 1969 Japanese concept car

Other uses
 EX3, a postcode district in the EX postcode area in England